Juan Antonio Páez Cepeda (born 13 February 1950) is a Chilean football manager and former footballer who played as a centre-back.

Playing career
Born in Santiago, as a child Páez was with Juventud Universitaria and next he moved to Universidad Católica. After playing for Ferroviarios in Segunda División, he played in the Primera División for Palestino, Lota Schwager, Cobreloa, Regional Atacama, Santiago Wanderers, Green Cross-Temuco and Deportes Concepción. 

With Palestino, he won the 1975 Copa Chile, making 6 appearances in the tournament. At league level, he made 71 appearances and scored 4 goals from 1973 to 1975. 

Lota Schwager, with Páez in the squad, got the best season in its history after reached the sixth place in the 1977 Primera División. At league level, he made 110 appearances and scored 7 goals from 1975 to 1979.

He played for Cobreloa in 1980 and 1981, making 47 appearances and scoring 8 goals and winning the league title in 1980. In addition, he took part in the 1981 Copa Libertadores, where Cobreloa was the runner-up after being defeated by Flamengo.

In his last years as footballer, he played in the Segunda División for Curicó Unido, Soinca Bata and Coquimbo Unido.

Coaching career
Páez mainly developed his career in Chile at both the second and the third divisions. San Antonio Unido was the club what he coached more times: 1998, 2000–01 and 2007. In the Primera División, he led Deportes Melipilla in 1993.

Abroad, Páez had a stint with the Indonesian club Persib Bandung (2003–04), saving it from the relegation to the lower division. In the club, he coached his compatriots Alejandro Tobar, Claudio Lizama, Julio Lopez and Angelo Espinosa.

Personal life
He is the younger brother of the Chilean former international footballer Guillermo Páez.

Honours

Player
Palestino
 Copa Chile: 1975

Cobreloa
 Primera División: 1980

References

External links
 
 
 Juan Páez at PlaymakerStats
 Juan Páez at MemoriaWanderers 

1950 births
Living people
Footballers from Santiago
Chilean footballers
Club Deportivo Universidad Católica footballers
Ferroviarios footballers
Club Deportivo Palestino footballers
Lota Schwager footballers
Cobreloa footballers
Regional Atacama footballers
Santiago Wanderers footballers
Deportes Temuco footballers
Deportes Concepción (Chile) footballers
Curicó Unido footballers
Deportes Melipilla footballers
Coquimbo Unido footballers
Chilean Primera División players
Primera B de Chile players
Association football defenders
Chilean football managers
Chilean expatriate football managers
Deportes Melipilla managers
Provincial Osorno managers
Deportes Iquique managers
Magallanes managers
Persib Bandung managers
Chilean Primera División managers
Primera B de Chile managers
Expatriate football managers in Indonesia
Chilean expatriate sportspeople in Indonesia